Borotice is a municipality and village in Příbram District in the Central Bohemian Region of the Czech Republic. It has about 400 inhabitants.

Administrative parts
The villages of Čelina, Cholín, Dražetice and Hubenov are administrative parts of Borotice.

References

Villages in Příbram District